"Selecta" is a song by Grammy Award-winning Dutch music producers and DJs Afrojack and Quintino. The single was released digitally on July 6, 2011 in the Netherlands.

The song was included on the Cream, Pacha, Gatecrasher and Ministry of Sound compilation known as Superclub, it was included on "Superclub Ibiza" in 2011.

Track listing

Chart performance

Release history

References

2011 singles
Afrojack songs
Songs written by Afrojack
Spinnin' Records singles